Bradley “Brad” Smith (born 1 July 1987) is an Australian entrepreneur and former motocross rider, who founded the motocross brand “Braaap”. In 2010 he was named Young Australian of the Year for Tasmania, Australian Young Entrepreneur of the year and International Young Entrepreneur of the year runner up.

In 2008 Smith launched the first Braaap store, a retail outlet in Australia. Braaap expanded to a total of four retail outlets across Tasmania and Victoria.

Personal life 
Smith was born in Launceston, Tasmania, Australia to middle-class parents.

Braaap 

The first Braaap store opened in Launceston in 2005 with additional Tasmanian stores in Hobart and Devonport, and another in Frankston, Victoria.

Braaap motorcycles were manufactured in China. The motorcycles were assembled locally by in Braaap stores.

Closure of Braaap retail outlets began with Devonport in June 2013, Hobart in July 2017 and Launceston in January 2018.

Australian Superlite Champion 
In June 2010 Smith was placed as the highest ranking Australian at the World Mini SX Championships in Las Vegas. After the 2010 World finals he finished in 11th place, competing against full-time professional riders from around the world.

References 

1987 births
Living people
People from Launceston, Tasmania
Australian motivational speakers
Australian company founders
Australian motocross riders
Motorcycling people
Motorcycle designers